Lakshmi Chandrashekar is an Indian actress in the Kannada film industry, and a theatre artist in Karnataka, India. Some of the notable films of Lakshmi Chandrashekar as an actress include Atithi (2002), Avasthe (1987), S. P. Sangliyana Part 2 (1990).

Awards

Career 
Lakshmi Chandrashekar has been part of more than 10 films and 35 drama plays in Kannada and English, with drama  'Singarevva mattu Aramane'   playing in national and international drama festivals and in universities and conferences on women's issues. She was part of Kannada television series  'Mayamruga' , 'Manthana'  etc.

Selected filmography 

 Kiragoorina Gayyaligalu (2016)
 Tananam Tananam (2006)
 Beru (2005)
 Atithi (2002)
 Mathadana (2001)
 Avasthe (1987)

Drama Works

See also

List of people from Karnataka
Cinema of Karnataka
List of Indian film actresses
Cinema of India

References

External links

Actresses in Kannada cinema
Living people
Kannada people
Actresses from Karnataka
Actresses from Bangalore
Indian film actresses
21st-century Indian actresses
Actresses in Kannada television
Actresses in Kannada theatre
1951 births